Antarctica is a 1991 IMAX  film documenting the continent of Antarctica. The film has a 38-minute runtime, and consists of aerial footage of the topography and fauna of the continent. It was narrated by Alex Scott and has music by Australian composer Nigel Westlake, who later adapted his score into a popular concert suite of the same name for guitar and orchestra.

As well as screening in IMAX theatres, the movie was released on laserdisc, DVD, Blu-ray and has been available in high definition on streaming services, although the quality of the image on DVD was poor.

It grossed more than US$65 million and is one of the most profitable Australian-financed films.

Personnel 
Director: John Weiley 
Producers: John Weiley, David Flatman
Writers: Les Murray, Michael Perfit, John Weiley
 Narrator: Alex Scott
 Music: Nigel Westlake

References

External links

1991 films
1991 documentary films
IMAX short films
Films set in Antarctica
1991 short films
Films shot in Antarctica
Films scored by Nigel Westlake
IMAX documentary films
1990s English-language films